Lova Boy  is a recording artist and entrepreneur from Belize, specializing in Punta rock music.

Biography
Daniel Cacho aka Lova Boy, the self-proclaimed "Prince Ah Belize", grew up on the impoverished streets of Dangriga, Belize.
A descendant of the Garifuna people Lova Boy is the son of a mother who came to America from Belize during the 1980s in pursuit of the American dream.

A traditional Punta singer, Elvira Lambey (Guribiyuwa) was one of Lova Boy's earliest musical influences.

References

Living people
Belizean musicians
Year of birth missing (living people)